Han Seung-woo may refer to:
 Han Seung-woo (sport shooter)
 Han Seung-woo (singer)